The 1913 North Carolina A&M Aggies football team represented the North Carolina A&M Aggies of North Carolina College of Agriculture and Mechanic Arts during the 1913 college football season. The Aggies were coached by Edward L. Greene in his fifth year as head coach, compiling a 6–1 record.

Schedule

References

North Carolina AandM
NC State Wolfpack football seasons
South Atlantic Intercollegiate Athletic Association football champion seasons
North Carolina AandM Aggies football